The 1908 Nobel Prize in Literature was awarded to the German philosopher Rudolf Christoph Eucken (1846–1926) "in recognition of his earnest search for truth, his penetrating power of thought, his wide range of vision, and the warmth and strength in presentation with which in his numerous works he has vindicated and developed an idealistic philosophy of life." He is the second German to be awarded the prize and the first philosopher to be a recipient.

Laureate

Rudolf Eucken centered his philosophy on the human experience. He maintained that man is the meeting place of nature and spirit and that it is man's duty to overcome his nonspiritual nature by actively striving after the spiritual life. Some of his major works are Die Einheit des Geisteslebens ("The Unity of the Spiritual Life", 1888), Geistige Strömungen der Gegenwart ("Main Currents of Modern Thoughts", 1908), Der Sinn und Wert des Lebens ("The Meaning and Value of Life", 1908), Können wir noch Christen sein? ("Can We Still Be Christians?", 1911), and Der Sozialismus und seine Lebensgestaltung ("Individual and Society", 1923).

Deliberations

Nominations
Eucken had never been nominated for the prize before, making him one of the 10 laureates who won on a rare occasion when they have been awarded the Nobel Prize in Literature the same year they were first nominated. He received a single nomination from a member of the Swedish Academy.

In total, the academy received 23 nominations for 16 individuals. Among the nominees include Jaroslav Vrchlický, Selma Lagerlöf (awarded in 1909, John Morley, Algernon Charles Swinburne, and Antonio Fogazzaro. Six of the nominees were newly nominated such as the controversial Elisabeth Förster-Nietzsche, Adolf von Harnack, Julio Calcaño and Edmondo De Amicis.

The authors Vicente Acosta, Anton Giulio Barrili, Wilhelm Busch, Julia Abigail Cartney, Karl Josef Rudolph Cornely, Manuel Curros Enríquez, Joaquim Machado de Assis, Alexander Ertel, Carl Ewald, Louis-Honoré Fréchette, Joel Chandler Harris, Ludovic Halévy, Bronson Howard, Jonas Lie, Aurora Ljungstedt, Jadwiga Łuszczewska, Otto Pfleiderer, Anthony Winkler Prins, Maria Louise Ramé (known as Ouida), Evgeny Salias De Tournemire, Victorien Sardou, Susan Marr Spalding, Edmund Clarence Stedman, and Aleksey Zhemchuzhnikov died in 1908 without having been nominated for the prize. Italian novelist Edmondo de Amicis died months before the announcement.

Reactions
The choice of philosopher Rudolf Christoph Eucken as Nobel laureate in 1908 is widely considered to be one of the worst mistakes in the history of the Nobel Prize in Literature. The main candidates for the prize that year were poet Algernon Swinburne and author Selma Lagerlöf, but the Academy were divided between the candidates and, as a compromise, Eucken, representative of the Academy's interpretation of Nobel's "ideal direction", was launched as an alternative candidate that could be agreed upon.

Burton Feldman, author of The Nobel Prize: A History of Geniuses Controversy, and Prestige describes Eucken as a laureate "so forgotten that even philosophers are usually surprised he was a philosopher." While journalist Stuart Reid of The Atlantic describes him as "a deservedly forgotten philosopher who was never important."

Nobel lecture
Eucken delivered a Nobel lecture entitled Naturalism or Idealism? on 27 March 1909 at Stockholm.

Notes

References

External links
Award ceremony speech by Harald Hjärne nobelprize.org

1908